The Oaklawn Mile Stakes is a Grade III American Thoroughbred horse race for four-year-olds and older at a distance of one mile on the dirt run annually in April at Oaklawn Park Race Track in Hot Springs, Arkansas.  The event currently offers a purse of $400,000.

History
The inaugural running of the event was on 3 May 2019 run as the ninth race on the day's card over a distance of one mile on the dirt track. The event was won by Michael M. Hui's  Exulting starting at 11/1 winning in a time of 1:36.74. 

With increased revenue from the racino the administration of the track in 2019 added stakes events to their racing calendar and created this mile race for older horses.

This event attracted accomplished gallopers such as 2020 Grade I winner Tom's d'Etat and the American Graded Stakes Committee upgraded the status of the event to Grade III for 2022.

Records
Speed record:
1:35.83 – Tom's d'Etat   (2020)

Margins:
 1 length – Exulting  (2019)  

Most wins by an owner:
 No owner has won the event more than once

Most wins by a jockey:
 No jockey has won the event more than once

Most wins by a trainer:
 No trainer has won the event more than once

Winners

See also
 List of American and Canadian Graded races

External sites
Oaklawn Park Media Guide 2020

References

Graded stakes races in the United States
Recurring sporting events established in 2019
Grade 3 stakes races in the United States
Open mile category horse races
Oaklawn Park
2019 establishments in Arkansas